The Julian Alps are a mountain range of the Southern Limestone Alps that stretch from northeastern Italy to Slovenia, where they rise to 2,864 m at Mount Triglav, the highest peak in Slovenia. A large part of the Julian Alps is included in Triglav National Park. The second highest peak of the range, the 2,755 m high Jôf di Montasio, lies in Italy.

The Julian Alps cover an estimated 4,400 km2 (of which 1,542 km2 lies in Italy). They are located between the Sava Valley and Canale Valley. They are divided into the Eastern and Western Julian Alps.

Name
The Julian Alps were known in antiquity as Alpe Iulia, and also attested as Alpes Juliana  AD 670, Alpis Julia  734, and Alpes Iulias in 1090. Like the municipium of Forum Julii (now Cividale del Friuli) at the foot of the mountains, the range was named after Julius Caesar of the Julian clan, perhaps due to a road built by Julius Caesar and completed by Augustus.

Eastern Julian Alps

There are many peaks in the Eastern Julian Alps over 2,000 m high, and they are mainly parts of ridges. The most prominent peaks are visible by their height and size. There are high plateaus on the eastern border, such as Pokljuka, Mežakla, and Jelovica.

The main peaks by height are the following:
 Triglav  – the highest mountain and on the coat of arms of Slovenia 
 Škrlatica 
 Mangart 
 Jalovec 
 Razor 
 Kanjavec 
 Prisojnik  
 Rjavina  
 Prestreljenik 
 Špik 
 Tosc 
 Krn

Western Julian Alps
The Western Julian Alps cover a much smaller area, and are located mainly in Italy. Only the Kanin group lies in part in Slovenia.
The main peaks by height are:
 Jôf di Montasio
 Jôf Fuart
 High Mount Kanin

Passes 
Important passes of the Julian Alps are:
The Vršič Pass, 1,611 m (5,826 feet), links the Sava and Soča valleys. It is the highest mountain road pass in Slovenia.
The Predil Pass (links Villach via Tarvisio and Bovec to Gorizia), paved road 1,156 m (3,792 feet)
The Pontebba Pass (links Villach via Tarvisio and Pontebba to Udine), railway, paved road, 797 m (2,615 feet)

Gallery

See also
Italian Julian Alps
Triglav Lakes Valley
List of mountains in Slovenia
Slovenian Mountain Hiking Trail

References

External links

Julian Alps on Hiking Trail
Julian Alps on SummitPost
 Julian Alps in Slovenia (All information about it)

 
Mountain ranges of the Alps
Mountain ranges of Italy
Mountain ranges of Slovenia

Southern Limestone Alps
Landforms of Upper Carniola
Biosphere reserves of Slovenia
Natura 2000 in Slovenia